En stjärna lyser i natt is a 2010 Christmas album by Christer Sjögren. The album release also saw Christer Sjögren on Christmas tour with Elisabeth Andreassen across Sweden and Norway.

Track listing

Contributors
Christer Sjögren - vocals
Magnus Johansson - trumpet
Mats Ronander - harmonica
Mårgan Höglund - drums, percussion
Thobias Gabrielsson - bass
Sebastian Nylund - guitar
Lennart Sjöholm - producer
Immanuel gospelkör - vocals

Charts

Weekly charts

Year-end charts

Certifications

References 

2010 Christmas albums
Christmas albums by Swedish artists
Christer Sjögren albums
Pop rock Christmas albums
Swedish-language albums